The 2016 season is Keflavík 10th season in 1. deild karla and their 1st season in the second-tier of Icelandic football after being relegated in 2015. Along with the 1. deild karla, the club also competed in the Borgunarbikar, where they were knocked out in the third round, and the Deildabikar, where they reached the semi-finals stage before losing to KR 4–0.

Results & fixtures

1. deild karla

Deildabikar

Borgunarbikar

Squad statistics

Appearances and goals
Last updated 23 August 2016

|}

Transfers

Players in

Players out

References

External links
Keflavík website

Knattspyrnudeild
1. deild karla (football)
Keflavík
Keflavík ÍF